Ferenc Futurista, born as František Fiala (7 December 1891 – 19 June 1947) was a Czechoslovak film actor. He appeared in more than 45 films between 1918 and 1945.

Selected filmography
 Tu ten kámen (1923)
 The Lantern (1925)
 The Lantern (1938)
 The Doll (Panenka, 1938) 
 Cesta do hlubin študákovy duše (1939)
 Muzikantská Liduška (1940)
 Ladies in Waiting (1940)
 The Blue Star Hotel (1941)
 A Charming Man (1941)
 Auntie's Fantasies (1941)
 The Respectable Ladies of Pardubice (1944)
 The Wedding Ring (1944)

References

External links
 

1891 births
1947 deaths
Actors from Prague
People from the Kingdom of Bohemia
Czechoslovak male actors